Johnson Donatus Aihumekeokhai Ojeikere (1930 – 2 February 2014), known as J.D. 'Okhai Ojeikere, was a Nigerian photographer known for his work with unique hairstyles found in Nigeria.

Biography  

Ojeikere was born 10 June in 1930 in Ovbiomu-Emai, Owan East, Edo State, a rural village in southwestern Nigeria. In addition to the dialect Emai, Ojeikere spoke Yoruba and English. He worked and lived in Ketu, Nigeria. At the age of 20, he took up photography, which was out of the ordinary for people in Nigeria, especially those in his village. Cameras were not in high demand and were of low priority as they were considered a luxury. However, in 1950 Enugu, Ojeikere bought a modest Brownie D camera without flash for two pounds, and had a friend teach him the fundamentals of photography. Ojeikere gained information about the Ministry for Information in Ibadan in 1951, in which he would write the same letter to them every 15 days for two years. At the end of 1953, they finally replied that they received Ojeikere’s request, and it caught their attention. 

Ojeikere started out as a darkroom assistant in 1954 at the Ministry of Information in Ibadan. In 1959, he became very busy with his professional activities in Ibadan and decided it was time to marry. Before Ojeikere left the village of Ogute-Emai, he had chosen his wife, Ikegbua. Once she reached of age in 1959, they paid the dowry and held a traditional marriage ceremony in their village. The following year they welcomed their first son. Later, they went on to have a total of five children and are Catholic Christians. After Nigeria gained its independence in 1960, Ojeikere pursued his first job as a photographer. In 1961 he became a studio photographer, under Steve Rhodes, for Television House Ibadan. From 1963 to 1975 Ojeikere worked in publicity at West Africa Publicity in Lagos. In 1967 he was invited to join the Nigerian Arts Council. In 1968 he began one of his largest projects as he documented Nigerian hairstyles. This was a hallmark of his work and he printed approximately a thousand pictures of different African women's hair. In 1975, after 12 years of working, while Ojeikere was chief commercial photographer, his job was abolished. He left the company with an excellent photo library that was still in use allowing him to setup his own business with the help of every at Lagos Island, opening a studio named “Foto Ojeikere.”

At the first Nigeria Photography Award (NIPHA) ceremony, organized by the multimedia organization Fullhouse Entertainment and held on Sunday, 31 July 2011, Ojeikere was one of prominent Nigerian photographers, alongside Sunmi Smart-Cole, [[Don Barber, and Amos Olarenwaju Osidele, who were given lifetime achievement awards.

A large selection of Ojeikere's work was included in the arsenale section of the 55th Venice Biennale d'arte, "Il Palazzo Enciclopedia" curated by Massimiliano Gioni in 2013.

Ojeikere died on 2 February 2014, at the age of 83. He is the subject of a documentary film by Tam Fiofori entitled J. D. ‘Okhai Ojeikere: Master Photographer.

Legacy 
On Ojeikere's death, he left behind an archive of well over 10,000 photographs of his home country Nigeria.

His photography covers show how the hairstyles are seen as artistic, cultural, material, and social process, forming part of the unfolding African postcolonial modernity. Mentioning how, that the term used for many of the hairstyles he documented is “Onile-Gogoro” a Yoruba expression meaning “stand tall” which was used to refer to the multi-story buildings then sprouting in Nigerian cities and popularized through the music that defined the language and social movements of the 1960s. Also, the titles of Ojeikere’s photographs are often quite literal.

Ojeikere is most recognized for the black-and-white shots of elaborate, gravity-defying Nigerian hairstyles that he started photographing in the 1950s, which were presented at the 2013 Venice Biennale. Yet as one of the first photojournalists in Nigeria, having lived from 1930 through the country’s independence in 1960, military dictatorships, and village and city life, his perspective was much wider than fashion. Ojeikere also achieved an international profile in his lifetime, with his photography now in collections from the Metropolitan Museum of Art to the Tate Modern. Upon his death, Giulia Paoletti in the Department of the Arts of Africa, Oceania, and the Americas at the Metropolitan Museum of Art wrote: "His formal vocabulary is immediately recognizable: lack of backdrops or props, elegant female sitters, elaborate coiffures, soft lighting, immaculate black-and-white printing. In Ojeikere’s hands, photography became a means to record the transient creativity that articulated Nigerian social and cultural life."

Medina Dugger, a Lagos-based photographer and admirer of Ojeikere’s oeuvre made the statement: "Prior to British rule, traditional hairstyles were the norm and varied according to tribe, social status, marital status, and special events.”  Dugger first traveled to Nigeria’s largest city in 2011 at the behest of a classmate who had co-founded the LagosPhoto festival. It was there that she encountered Ojeikere’s photography—his “Hairstyles” led to the creation of Dugger’s "Chroma: An Ode to J.D. ‘Okhai Ojeikere," a series of bold, color-soaked photos depicting modern, multi-hued updates of the hairstyles featured in Ojeikere’s work.

Publications
J.D.'Okhai Ojeikere: Photographs. Zürich: Scalo, 2000. Edited by Andre Magnin. .

Collections
Art Institute of Chicago, Chicago, IL: 1 print (as of August 2020)
Museum of Modern Art, New York: 3 pairs of prints (as of August 2020)
Metropolitan Museum of Art, New York:  prints (as of August 2020)
Museum of Fine Arts, Houston, Houston, Texas: 13 prints (as of August 2020)

Exhibitions

Solo exhibitions 
 1995: Ojeikere's first solo exhibition in Nigeria as well as an exhibition in Switzerland (first work shown outside his home country) 
 2000: J. D. ‘Okhai Ojeikere, Fondation Cartier pour l'Art Contemporain, Paris, France
 2001: J. D. ‘Okhai Ojeikere: Hairstyles 1968 – 1999, MAMCO Musée d’art moderne et contemporain, Geneva, Switzerland
 2005: Hairstyles: J.D. ‘Okhai Ojeikere, Blaffer Art Museum of the University of Houston, Texas, USA
 2009: Hairdos and Parties: African Typographies by J.D. 'Okhai Ojeikere and Malick Sidibé, L. Parker Stephenson Photographs, New York 
 2010: Sartorial Moments, Centre for Contemporary Art, Lagos, Nigeria
 2011: J.D. 'Okhai Ojeikere: Moments of Beauty, Centre for Contemporary Art, Lagos, Nigeria
 2011: J.D. 'Okhai Ojeikere: Moments of Beauty, Kiasma Museum of Contemporary Art, Helsinki, Finland
 2014: J.D. 'Okhai Ojeikere: Hairstyles and Headdresses, Royal Festival Hall, Southbank, London, UK

Group exhibitions 
2000: Africa: Past-Present, Fifty-One Fine Art Photography, Antwerp
2001: Face Off, Aeroplastics Contemporary, Brussels
2002: Collection in Context – Recent Photography Acquisitions, The Studio Museum in Harlem, New York, USA
2003: Highlights from the collection of Foundation Cartier pour l’art contemporain, Paris: William Eggleston, Beat Streuli, Bill Viola, Vik Muniz, J.D. ‘Okhai Ojeikere, Pierrick sorin, Bildmuseet Umea Universitett, Umea, Sweden
2004: Joy of Life – two photographers from Africa: Seydou Keita, J.D. ‘Okhai Ojeikere, Hara Museum of Contemporary Art, Tokyo, Japan
2004: Nous Remontons de la "Calle" Toutes les Photographies!, Galerie du Jour Agnés B., Paris, France
2004: La collection d'art contemporain d'Agnès b. Je m'installe aux Abattoirs, Les Abattoirs – Frac Midi-Pyrénées, Toulouse, France
2005: Masterpieces from the Jean Pigozzi Collection, MFAH Museum of Fine Arts Houston, Houston, TX, USA
2006: 100% Africa, Guggenheim Museum, Bilbao, Spain
2006: About Africa Part One: Seydou Keita, Malick Sidbé, Jean-Dominque Burton, Jürgen Schadeberg, J. D. ‘Okhai Ojeikere, Fifty-One Fine Art Photography, Antwerp, Belgium.
2006: Some Tribes, Christophe Guye Galerie, Zurich, Switzerland
2008: Head Room, Mocca – Museum of Contemporary Canadian Art, Toronto, ON
2009: Chance Encounters, Sakshi Gallery, Mumbai
2009: 70s. Photography and Everyday Life, Teatro Fernan Gomez, PHotoEspaña, Madrid, Spain (catalogue )
2009: 70s. Photography and Everyday Life, Museo D’Arte Provincia di Nuoro, Nuoro, Italy (catalogue )
2009: J. D. 'Okhai Ojeikere and Malick Sidibe: Hairdos and Parties- African Typologies, L. Parker Stephenson Photographs, New York, USA
2010: 70s. Photography and Everyday Life, Centro Andaluz de Arte Contemporaneo, Seville, Spain (catalogue )
2010: 70s. Photography and Everyday Life, Nederlands Fotomuseum, Rotterdam, Netherlands (catalogue )
2010: A Midsummer Gallery Soirée, Hagedorn Foundation Gallery, Atlanta, GA, USA
2010: AIPAD – The Photography Show, L. Parker Stephenson Photographs, Park Avenue Armory, New York, USA
2010: National Black Arts Festival, Atlanta, GA, USA
2011: Becoming: Photographs from the Wedge Collection, Tate Modern, London, England
2012: Africa/Africa, Abbaya St. André, Centre d'art contemporain de Meymac, Meymac, France
2013: Voyage Retour – Federal Government Press, Broad Street, Lagos, Lagos Island, Nigeria
2013: The Encyclopedic Palace curated by Massimiliano Gioni, The Venice Biennale, Venice, Italy
2014: Back to Front, Mariane Ibrahim Gallery, Seattle, USA
2014: Ici l'Afrique, Château de Penthes, Pregny-Chambésy, France
2015: Making Africa - A Continent of Contemporary Design, Vitra Design Museum, Weil am Rhein, Germany
2016: Regarding Africa: Contemporary Art and Afro-Futurism, Tel Aviv Museum of Art, Tel Aviv, Israel
2020: Through an African Lens: Sub-Saharan Photography from the Museum's Collection, The Museum of Fine Arts, Houston, Houston, Texas

References

External links 
J.D. Okhai Ojeikere on the African American Visual Artists Database via Internet Archive

1930 births
2014 deaths
Nigerian photographers